Yang Huanming (born 6 October 1952), also known as Henry Yang, is a Chinese biologist, businessman and one of China's leading genetics researchers. He is Chairman and co-founder of the Beijing Genomics Institute, formerly of the Chinese Academy of Sciences. He was elected as member of the Chinese Academy of Sciences in 2007, a foreign academician of Indian National Science Academy in 2009, a member of the German National Academy of Sciences in 2012, and foreign associate of the US National Academy of Science in 2014.

Early life and education
Yang was born on October 6, 1952 near Wenzhou, Zhejiang, China. He received his B.Sc from Hangzhou University (now part of Zhejiang University) in 1978, followed by a master's degree in biology in 1982 from the Nanjing Railroad Medical Institute (now Southeast University). Yang earned his Ph.D in 1988 from the Institute of Medical Genetics of University of Copenhagen, Denmark. He then completed his post-doctoral training in Europe (at CIML, INSERM/CNRS, Marseille, France, 1988–90) and the United States (at Harvard Medical School and UCLA, 1990–94).

Research
Yang's work include the mapping and cloning of human genes, the sequencing and analysis of the human genome, human genome diversity and evolution, and the ethical, legal, and social issues related to genome research. The study of Yang and his collaborators at the Beijing Genomics Institute on the rice genome made the cover of the April 5, 2002 issue of Science magazine. Yang led a 2000 UNESCO sponsored symposium held in Hangzhou on research ethics that focused on some questionable research projects by foreign researchers in Anhui Province and on strengthening the protection of human research subjects in China. With his interest in bioethics, Yang was the only Chinese appointee on International Research Panel of President Obama's Presidential Commission for the Study of Bioethical issues in 2011 investigating the 1940s Guatemala syphilis experiment.

Yang led China's participation in the international Human Genome Project. Yang is a member of the Chinese Academy of Sciences. He was also Coordinator-in-China of the International HapMap Consortium and Chief Coordinator of the Chinese Hybrid Rice Genome Consortium. Yang is Secretary-General of the Chinese Human Genome Project (CHGP), Secretary-General of the Human Genome Diversity Committee, and Secretary-General of the Committee of Ethical, Legal, and Social Issues (ELSI), CHGP.

Yang is also a member of Collegium International, an organization of leaders with political, scientific, and ethical expertise whose goal is to provide new approaches in overcoming the obstacles in the way of a peaceful, socially just and an economically sustainable world.

Beijing Genomics Institute

Yang leads an institute that has a dual public-private nature since it first established with the help of Wenzhou businesspeople as the Huada Genomics Research Institute (or Beijing Genomics Institute in English) and then later received Chinese government support as the Beijing Genomics Institute of the Chinese Academy of Sciences. Unusual for an institute of the Chinese Academy of Sciences, 80% of the 500 research positions at the BGI laboratories in Beijing and Hangzhou was supported through competitive grants from both Chinese and foreign sources. In 2007 BGI split from the Chinese Academy of Sciences and moved their headquarters to Shenzhen as the first citizen-managed, non-profit research institution in China.

References

External links
 Nikkei Asia Prize Winners 2003: Yang Huanming "Work in genomics could help end world hunger"
 September 2005 Xinhua press service story on how Yang Huanming organized Chinese participation in the international human genome project.
 Beijing Genomics Institute, Chinese Academy of Sciences
 Huada Genomics Institute of Hangzhou (in Chinese)

1952 births
Living people
Biologists from Zhejiang
Businesspeople from Wenzhou
Chinese chief executives
Chinese company founders
Chinese geneticists
Educators from Wenzhou
Foreign associates of the National Academy of Sciences
Foreign Fellows of the Indian National Science Academy
Hangzhou University alumni
Harvard Medical School people
Members of the Chinese Academy of Sciences
Academic staff of Peking Union Medical College
Scientists from Wenzhou
Southeast University alumni
University of Copenhagen alumni
Winners of the Nikkei Asia Prize
20th-century Chinese scientists
21st-century Chinese scientists